Vice Admiral Robert Don Oliver CB CBE DSC DL (17 March 1895 – 6 October 1980) was a Royal Navy officer who was appointed Deputy Chief of the Naval Staff.

Naval career
Oliver served in World War I taking part in the Battle of the Falkland Islands in 1914, fighting at Gallipoli in 1915 and then undertaking mine-laying off the German and Belgian coast. Promoted to captain, he was given command of HMS Iron Duke in 1939.

He also served in World War II and was commanding HMS Devonshire, a heavy cruiser, on 21 November 1941 when he was informed that codebreakers had determined that German U-boats were going to be surfacing near him, to refuel from a merchant raider, the Hilfskreuzer (cruiser) Atlantis. Using the intelligence, Devonshire sunk Atlantis. He later commanded the gunnery school HMS Excellent and then the cruiser .

After the War he was appointed Assistant Chief of Naval Staff (Weapons) and then Deputy Chief of the Naval Staff in 1946. His last appointment, in 1947, was as Flag Officer commanding the 5th Cruiser Squadron before he retired in 1948.

In retirement he became Deputy Lieutenant of Roxburghshire.

Family
In 1928 he married Torfrida Lois Acantha Huddart; there were no children. Following the death of his first wife, he married Mrs M.J. Glendinning van der Velde in 1965.

References

1895 births
1980 deaths
Royal Navy officers of World War II
Royal Navy vice admirals
Companions of the Order of the Bath
Commanders of the Order of the British Empire
Recipients of the Distinguished Service Cross (United Kingdom)
Royal Navy officers of World War I
Deputy Lieutenants of Roxburghshire
Lords of the Admiralty